Carex brevicollis is a species of sedge (genus Carex), found in Spain, France, Slovakia, Hungary, Romania, Bulgaria, Ukraine, the former Yugoslavia, Anatolia, the north Caucasus, and the Transcaucasus. It prefers to grow in calcareous mountain grasslands.

References

brevicollis
Plants described in 1815